Jackson Muleka Kyanvubu (born 4 October 1999) is a Congolese professional footballer who plays as a striker for Süper Lig club Beşiktaş and the DR Congo national team.

Club career

Kasımpaşa
On 8 February 2022, Muleka was loaned to Kasımpaşa in Turkey until June 2022, without an option to buy.

Beşiktaş
On July 7, 2022 Muleka signed a 5 year deal with Süper Lig club Beşiktaş. For Muleka's transfer Beşiktaş paid 3.500.000 € to Standard Liège.

Career statistics

Club

International

Scores and results list DR Congo's goal tally first, score column indicates score after each Muleka goal.

References

1999 births
Living people
Democratic Republic of the Congo footballers
Association football forwards
Democratic Republic of the Congo international footballers
Democratic Republic of the Congo youth international footballers
Linafoot players
Belgian Pro League players
Süper Lig players
TP Mazembe players
Standard Liège players
Kasımpaşa S.K. footballers
Beşiktaş J.K. footballers
Democratic Republic of the Congo expatriate footballers
Expatriate footballers in Belgium
Democratic Republic of the Congo expatriate sportspeople in Belgium
Expatriate footballers in Turkey
Democratic Republic of the Congo expatriate sportspeople in Turkey
21st-century Democratic Republic of the Congo people